The 1880 United States presidential election in New York took place on November 2, 1880. All contemporary 38 states were part of the 1880 United States presidential election. Voters chose 35 electors to the Electoral College, which selected the president and vice president.

New York was won by the Republican nominees, Congressman James A. Garfield of Ohio and his running mate former Collector of the Port of New York Chester A. Arthur of New York. Garfield and Arthur defeated the Democratic nominees, famed Civil War General Winfield Scott Hancock of Pennsylvania and his running mate former Congressman and banker William Hayden English of Indiana. 

Garfield narrowly carried New York State with 50.32 percent of the vote to Hancock's 48.42 percent, a victory margin of 1.90 percent. In a distant third came the Greenback Party candidate James B. Weaver with 1.12 percent.

Had Hancock won New York, he would have won the presidency with 190 electoral votes.

New York weighed in for this election as less than 2 percentage points more Republican than the national average. 

Hancock performed most strongly downstate in the New York City area, where he won New York County, Kings County, Queens County, and Richmond County. Hancock also won nearby Westchester County, and Rockland County. Garfield won much of upstate New York, including a victory in Erie County, home to the city of Buffalo, although Hancock did manage to win Albany County, home to the state capital of Albany, along with several rural upstate counties.

Results

Results by county

See also
 James A. Garfield
 Chester A. Arthur

References

New York
1880
1880 New York (state) elections